Most Terrifying Places in America was an American paranormal documentary television series that premiered on October 9, 2009 on the Travel Channel as a stand-alone special.  The special was subsequently broken down into an episodic series. Each episode featured the legends and stories of several reportedly haunted locations throughout America.

In October 2018, a five-episode special series aired on the Travel Channel which gave the show episode titles instead of numbered volumes.

Synopsis
The series was narrated by Mason Pettit. Each episode started off showing haunted "hotspots" on a map of the United States.A particular haunted location was then selected by each of the series' "ghost hunters," and investigated by them and their team. Paranormal investigators, historians, psychics, and mediums all presented commentary on these sites. Historical footage was often shown, and any eyewitnesses interviewed. The show reported on the paranormal as told from purported personal encounters with the supernatural. At the beginning of each episode a parental advisory was shown: "Warning: What you are about to see may be too extreme for the young, the impressionable, and the faint of heart. Parental discretion is advised."

Series overview

Specials

Each episode tells the tales of haunted locations, which are reportedly haunted by the supernatural

Part 1 (Special)

Part 2 (Special)

Part 3 (Special)

Part 4 (Special)

Part 5 (Special)

Part 6 (Special)

Part 7 (Special)

Special
A Halloween special named Most Terrifying Places in America: Top 13 aired on Friday October 29, 2010.  This special episode counted-down the 13 most terrifying places from past episodes.

Episodes

See also
 List of ghost films

References

Americas Most Terrifying Places; Locate-TV
Most Terrifying Places in America; AOL television
TV database; index

External links
Sharp Entertainment: production website

Paranormal reality television series
2009 American television series debuts
2000s American documentary television series
Travel Channel original programming
English-language television shows
2010 American television series endings